Tanghin-Dassouri is a department or commune of Kadiogo Province in central Burkina Faso. Its capital lies at the town of Tanghin-Dassouri.

International relations

Twin towns – Sister cities
Tanghin-Dassouri is twinned with:
 Belfort, France

References

Departments of Burkina Faso
Kadiogo Province